Tanja Heiberg Storm (27 April 1946 – 9 March 2023) was a Norwegian diplomat.

Biography
Born on 27 April 1946, Storm was assigned to the Ministry of Foreign Affairs since 1974. She was ambassador to the OECD in Paris from 2001 to 2006.

She was decorated Commander of the Order of St. Olav in 2002.

Storm died on 9 March 2023.

References

1946 births
2023 deaths
Norwegian diplomats